Edmond is an unincorporated community in Fayette County, in the U.S. state of West Virginia.

History
The community derives its name from Eddie Ryan, an early postmaster's son.

References

Unincorporated communities in Fayette County, West Virginia
Unincorporated communities in West Virginia